Athletics Cook Islands Inc. (ACI) is the governing body for the sport of athletics in the Cook Islands.

History 
ACI was founded as Cook Islands Amateur Athletics Association by Percy Henderson in 1962, and was affiliated to the IAAF in the year 1966. In 1979, Hugh Ngamata Henry was elected president. Later, Anne Tierney served as president.

Current president is Erin Tierney.

Affiliations 
International Association of Athletics Federations (IAAF)
Oceania Athletics Association (OAA)
Moreover, it is part of the following national organisations:
Cook Islands Sports and National Olympic Committee (CISNOC)

National records 
ACI maintains the Cook Islands records in athletics.

External links
Official Webpage
Facebook

References 

Cook Islands
Athletics in the Cook Islands
National governing bodies for athletics
Sports organizations established in 1962
Sports governing bodies in the Cook Islands